Hadronyche venenata is a venomous mygalomorph spider found in eastern Tasmania. Little is known about the toxicity of its venom, though its bite is reportedly painful.

References

External links

Atracidae
Spiders of Australia
Spiders described in 1927